Hugh of Newcastle (died 1322, buried in Paris) was a Franciscan theologian and scholastic philosopher, a pupil of Duns Scotus. His origin in Newcastle-upon-Tyne is questioned; he may have been from another place called Neufchâtel.

Works

He wrote a commentary on the Sentences of Peter Lombard. He was also author of a prophetic work De Victoria Christi contra Antichristum, from 1319, encyclopedic on the Apocalypse and its signs, printed in 1471.

In literature

Hugh is a character in The Name of the Rose by Umberto Eco.

References
Charles Victor Langlois (1925) Hugo de Novocastro or de Castronovo, Frater Minor; also printed in pp. 269–276, Andrew G. Little, Frederick M. Powicke (editors), Essays in Medieval History Presented to Thomas Frederick Tout (1977)

Notes

External links
Franaut page

1322 deaths
English Franciscans
Year of birth unknown
English theologians
English philosophers
Scholastic philosophers
14th-century philosophers